Charles Henry Richards (9 August 1875 – ?) was a professional footballer most notable for playing almost 100 matches for Grimsby Town.

Born in Burton upon Trent, Staffordshire, England, Richards began his career as an inside right with Derbyshire side Gresley Rovers. He then played for Newstead Byron for a time, before moving on to Notts County in July 1894. However, Richards transferred to Notts County's city rivals, Nottingham Forest, only 18 months later, where he played for a total of three seasons. He made 74 league appearances for Forest, scoring 20 goals.

In December 1898, Richards transferred to Grimsby Town, where he made 80 league appearances and scored 42 goals, including three penalties. In his final season with Grimsby, Richards and the rest of the team won promotion to the First Division by finishing top of the Second Division. He was then picked up by Leicester Fosse in June 1901. In his one season at Leicester, Richards made a total of 25 appearances, and scored five goals.

In August 1902, Richards signed for Manchester United, who had recently been rescued from financial difficulties by a generous benefactor, and renamed from Newton Heath FC. The club was languishing in the Second Division at the time, and was just beginning to get back on its feet. Richards played for United for just one season, scoring just one goal in eight league appearances. He finally moved to Doncaster Rovers in March 1903, where he would play till the end of the season before going into retirement.

Richards won his only England cap on 5 March 1898, in a 3–2 victory over Ireland in the Home Championship.

Honours
 Nottingham Forest
 FA Cup winner: 1898

References

External links

1875 births
Year of death missing
Sportspeople from Burton upon Trent
English footballers
England international footballers
Association football forwards
Gresley F.C. players
Newstead Byron F.C. players
Notts County F.C. players
Nottingham Forest F.C. players
Grimsby Town F.C. players
Leicester City F.C. players
Manchester United F.C. players
Doncaster Rovers F.C. players
English Football League players
FA Cup Final players